AMC-4 (formerly GE-4) is a commercial broadcast communications satellite owned by SES World Skies, part of SES S.A. (and formerly GE Americom, then SES Americom). Launched in 1999, from Centre Spatial Guyanais, ELA-2 by Ariane 44LP H10-3. It provides coverage to North America, Latin America, Caribbean. Located in a geostationary orbit, AMC-4 provides service to commercial and government customers, with programming distribution, satellite news gathering and broadcast internet capabilities.

AMC-4 was launched on 13 November 1999 at 22:54 UTC as GE-4, GE Americom's fourth A2100 hybrid C-band and Ku-band satellite. The C-band payload was home to national television networks broadcasting to thousands of cable television headends. AMC-4's Ku-band transponders served the direct-to-home (DTH), VSAT, business television and broadband Internet market segments. These Ku-band transponders are designed to be switchable between North and South American coverages. It was renamed AMC-4 after GE Americom was bought by SES and re-branded SES Americom. In 2009, SES Americom merged with SES New Skies to form SES World Skies. AMC-4 has been replaced by SES-1 in 2010. AMC-4 has been moved to 134.9° West, and currently has no FTA signals.

Transponder data

See also 

 NORAD

References 

Communications satellites in geostationary orbit
Spacecraft launched in 1999
SES satellites
AMC-04